The Cardiff Cobras are a rugby league club that plays in the Newcastle & Hunter Rugby League competition.  
Cardiff last won the A Grade Championship in 2014, defeating rivals Windale Eagles 24–20 at Kurri Kurri Sportsground.

History
Although Cardiff had been represented in Rugby League as far back as 1911, the Cardiff RFLC was formed 12 February 1930.
People present at the foundation meeting were A H Geikhe, D Smith, C Williams and Mr Clarke, who held the meeting at his house.
It was decided to enter a team in the Newcastle Rugby League third-grade competition along with an under 20s team.
Cardiff has cone a long way since its early days and has produced plenty of good Rugby League players including Jason Alchin, Mark Brokenshire, Rodney Howe, Ashley Gordon and many more.

Jerseys

Season summaries

Legend: 
 Champions,    Grand Finalist,  C Grade,    B Grade

References

Rugby clubs established in 1930
1930 establishments in Australia
Rugby league teams in Newcastle, New South Wales